Ogita or Ōgita may refer to
Ōgita Station, a JR East railway station in Ōdate, Akita Prefecture, Japan
Hiroki Ogita (born 1987), Japanese pole vaulter

Japanese-language surnames